The Formula Lites series was a single-seater formula racing class launched for 2015. The series is sanctioned by SCCA Pro Racing.

History
The High Performance Group and Crawford Composites announced the creation of the Formula Lites Series in 2014. Dane Cameron debuted the car at Virginia International Raceway during the 2014 Ultimate Track Car Challenge.

The first race of the Formula Lites Series was run at the Thompson Speedway Road Course. Driver Nick Neri won the inaugural event.

The series saw only six entries at every race during its initial season. The 2016 schedule was announced but no 2016 races have occurred, putting the series on indefinite hiatus.

Car
The drivers all use the same type of car. Crawford Composites designed and constructed the Crawford FL15. The Crawford FL15 has a carbon fiber monocoque chassis built according to FIA F3 technical regulations. The car is powered by a 2.4 L  Honda power plant.  The 2.4 L Honda K24 engine will be built by Honda Performance Development. The racing class was announced with the unveiling of the car at the North American Motorsports Expo.

Champions

See also

 Formula Three
 United States Formula Three Championship
 F3 Americas Championship

References

External links
Official website

Auto racing series in the United States
One-make series
Formula Three series
Formula racing series
2015 establishments in the United States
2016 disestablishments in the United States
Recurring sporting events established in 2015
Recurring sporting events disestablished in 2016